China Harbour Engineering Company Ltd (CHEC) is an engineering contractor and a subsidiary of China Communications Construction Company (CCCC), providing infrastructure construction, such as marine engineering, dredging and reclamation, road and bridge, railways, airports and plant construction.  It is the second largest dredging company in the world, carrying out projects in Asia, Africa, and Europe.

History 
The company was established in December 2005 during the merger of China Harbour Engineering Company Group (founded 1980) with China Road and Bridge Corporation into CCCC.

The Southern Africa Division (SAD) of CHEC was set in 2006 in Luanda, Angola, building business in 9 countries including Angola, Namibia, South Africa, Zambia, Mozambique Madagascar, Zimbabwe, Botswana on behalf of CHEC.

Projects 
CHEC has won large contracts for dredging, particularly in the Middle East and Asia.  In January 2011, the company was awarded a US$880million contract for the first phase of the New Doha port project, which involved the excavation of 58 million cubic metres of material (covering an area of 3.2 square kilometres to a depth of 18 metres) and the building of an 8-kilometre-long quay wall and a 5 km rubble breakwater.

Sri Lanka 

 Building the Port of Hambantota in Sri Lanka.

Costa Rica 
 Widening from two lanes, one in each direction, to four lanes, two in each direction on Route 32 between Guápiles and Puerto Limón. Project started in 2018, estimated delivery on 2020.

Colombia 
The Bogota Metro announced on October 17 that Apca Transmimetro, comprising China Harbor Engineering Company and Xi’An Metro Company, has been chosen for a $US 5.16bn contract to design, build, operate and maintain Line 1 of the Bogota metro.

Controversy 
In 2018, Sri Lankan State Minister of Finance and Mass Media Eran Wickramaratne called for an investigation into CHEC following reports that it had funded the campaign of Mahinda Rajapaksa during the 2015 Sri Lankan presidential election. CHEC denied funding the election campaign.

The company was debarred by the World Bank for bribery in Bangladesh.

See also 
 Belt and Road Initiative
 Foreign policy of China

References

External links 
 

Construction and civil engineering companies of China
Construction and civil engineering companies established in 2005
Chinese companies established in 2005
Government-owned companies of China